{{DISPLAYTITLE:C12H16N2O2}}
The molecular formula C12H16N2O2 (molar mass: 220.27 g/mol) may refer to:

 Eltoprazine, a serenic, or antiaggressive drug
 Methylenedioxybenzylpiperazine, a psychoactive drug